Bolivar Township is one of eleven townships in Benton County, Indiana. As of the 2020 census, its population was 1,179 and it contained 514 housing units. Bolivar Township was organized in March 1860 and named for South American liberator Simón Bolivar.

Geography

Cities and towns
 Otterbein (west half)

Unincorporated towns
 Foresman
 Templeton

Adjacent townships
 Center (northwest)
 Oak Grove (west)
 Pine (north)
 Adams Township, Warren County (southwest)
 Medina Township, Warren County (south)
 Round Grove Township, White County (northeast)
 Shelby Township, Tippecanoe County (east)

Major highways
  U.S. Route 52
  Indiana State Road 352

Cemeteries
The township contains one cemetery, Griffin.

Education
Benton Community School Corporation

References

Citations

Sources
 
 United States Census Bureau cartographic boundary files

External links

 Indiana Township Association
 United Township Association of Indiana

Townships in Benton County, Indiana
Lafayette metropolitan area, Indiana
Townships in Indiana
1860 establishments in Indiana